Tomás Taveira (born 1938) is a Portuguese architect.  He has a degree in architecture from the Technical University of Lisbon and owns a post-graduation from the Massachusetts Institute of Technology. Some of his most recognizable works include the Amoreiras Towers in Lisbon, three of the new stadiums for the 2004 UEFA European Football Championship in Portugal and the Allianz Parque stadium in São Paulo, Brazil.

Works

Tomás Taveira's emblematic buildings include:
Alfragide Towers
Zona J Housing Complex
Amoreiras Towers, Lisbon, Portugal
Arco-Íris Building, Lisbon, Portugal
BNU building, Av. 5 de Outubro, Lisbon, Portugal
Aveiro Stadium, Aveiro, Portugal
Alvalade Stadium, Lisbon, Portugal
Leiria Stadium, Leiria, Portugal
New Arena Palestra Itália, São Paulo, Brazil

Controversies

Video recordings affair
In the 1980s he was involved in a celebrity sex tape controversy when some personal home-made recordings he kept in videotapes were fortuitously discovered by his maid; unbeknownst to him, these recordings were duplicated and then used in an extortion attempt against him. Although Taveira initially complied with his former maid's demands, the recordings nevertheless found their way to the Portuguese magazine Semana Ilustrada, which had offered a substantial monetary reward in exchange for the copies. The recordings showed him having sexual intercourse and rough anal sex with different younger women inside his office at Amoreiras, Lisbon. Since then he gained huge notoriety. The Spanish magazine Interviú also published photos of the recorded scenes which prompted Taveira's lawyer to request court action against the magazine.

The infamous recordings with hardcore sexual content were made available in VHS tapes that spread to the general public and later on to peer-to-peer networks and pornographic video websites which accept user submissions.

Due to the scandal and related negative publicity, Taveira faced serious personal and professional setbacks until the late 1990s.

Bairro do Condado
The housing complex projected by Taveira in Marvila, Lisbon was scheduled for partial demolition. The main reason behind this municipal decision was urban and social degeneration caused by uncontrollable drug use and traffic, increased crime rates and juvenile delinquency. The building complex proved to be quite propitious to such behaviours as it included quite a lot of underused, marginal spaces with difficult possibilities of natural surveillance.

One of the main streets, named The Corridor of Death has been the stage of many gangster homicides and other crimes. The municipality found no solution other than the demolition of some blocks, as it was impossible to regenerate such spaces created by Taveira. This area has been depicted many times in Portuguese film history, including the film Zona J and the short-film Arena by João Salaviza, which won the Short Film Palme d'Or at Cannes Festival.

UTL affair
Taveira was a professor at the Faculty of Architecture of the Technical University of Lisbon until 2003, when he was expelled due to a disciplinary process.

References

External links
Official site

1938 births
Living people
Technical University of Lisbon alumni
20th-century Portuguese architects
21st-century Portuguese architects